Yasnensky (masculine), Yasnenskaya (feminine), or Yasnenskoye (neuter) may refer to:
Yasnensky District, a district of Orenburg Oblast, Russia
Yasnensky Urban Okrug, a municipal formation in Orenburg Oblast, Russia